Jacinto González (born 11 August 1941) is a Cuban basketball player. He competed in the men's tournament at the 1968 Summer Olympics.

References

External links
 

1941 births
Living people
Cuban men's basketball players
Olympic basketball players of Cuba
Basketball players at the 1968 Summer Olympics
People from Villa Clara Province